Rajendranagar is a legislative constituency of Telangana Legislative Assembly, India. It is one of 14 constituencies in Ranga Reddy district. It is part of Chevella Lok Sabha constituency. It is also one of the 24 constituencies of Greater Hyderabad Municipal Corporation.

T. Prakash Goud is currently representing the constituency.

Overview
It is newly formed constituency in 2009 general election (As per Delimitation Act of 2002) delimited from Chevella Assembly constituency. Rajendranagar Assembly constituency comprises four municipal divisions-Shivrampally, Mailardevpally, Rajendranagar and Attapur. Areas like Hassan Nagar and Shastripuram border the core of the Old Hyderabad City areas of Bahadurpura and Chandrayangutta. The Assembly Constituency presently comprises the following Mandals.

Members of Legislative Assembly

Election results

Telangana Legislative Assembly election, 2018

See also
 List of constituencies of Telangana Legislative Assembly

References

Assembly constituencies of Telangana
Ranga Reddy district
Memorials to Rajendra Prasad